Spunkmeyer may refer to:

 Otis Spunkmeyer, a baked-goods company
 Private D. Spunkmeyer, a character in the movie Aliens